Hyperwerks Entertainment was an American company that published comic books. It was founded by Karl Altstaetter and Jamie Douraghy in 1997. The two most notable Hyperwerks projects are the Deity and Rostam series.

History
Since its inception, Hyperwerks has created a three-part Deity mini-series: Original Series, Darkness & Light and Revelations which was published under the Image Comics banner. Additional titles from the Altstaetter/Napton creative team are two Deity spin-offs: Catseye and Kosmic Kat as well as the fantasy genre mini-series Saint Angel.

Additionally, artist and writer Steve Buccellato created the Weasel Guy Witchblade crossover as well as the black and white comic Weasel Guy: Road Trip.

Hyperwerks product line includes the Requiem: The Deity/Catseye three-issue mini-series.

Film Roman, the animation studio behind The Simpsons and King of the Hill optioned the rights to Deity with the intent of developing the comic book into an animated primetime television series marketed to a young, hip audience.

External links
 Hyperwerks Entertainment website
 Rostam Comic Book website
 
 Hyperwerks at the Big Comic Book DataBase
 

Comic book publishing companies of the United States